Bashar Jaafari, also Ja'afari,  (born April 14, 1956) is the former Permanent Representative of the Syrian Arab Republic to the United Nations Headquarters in New York City.

His qualifications include a Bachelor of Arts and French literature, a Diploma of Higher Studies in translation and Arabization from the University of Damascus, a Diploma of International Political Relations from the International Institute of Public Administration, Diploma of Higher Studies in International Organization's Management and a Doctorate 3rd cycle in political science from the University of Sceaux, State Doctorate in political science from the Paris University and a State Doctorate in History of Islamic Civilization in South East Asia from the University of Sharif Hedayatullah.

Diplomatic career
Jaafari began his career in 1980 as a diplomat in the Syrian Foreign Ministry. He served as a diplomat in France, until 1983 to the embassy's secretary and adviser to the Permanent Mission of the Syrian Arab Republic to the United Nations in 1991. He later returned to France, appointed as adviser at the Syrian embassy in Paris in 1997. He was also appointed as the Syrian ambassador to Indonesia in 1998 and as director of the International Organizations Department at the Syrian Foreign Ministry in 2002.

On 22 November 2020, Jaafari became the Deputy Minister of Foreign Affairs.

Personal life
Jafaari is married with three children. He is fluent in Arabic, English, French and Persian.

Books
 The Lobbies in the U.S.A (Damascus, 1983) 
 The Syrian Foreign Affairs 1946–1982 (Damascus, 1986) 
 The United Nations and the New World Order (Damascus, 1994)
 Moslem High Priests of the Far East "Historical Saga on the Way Islam Entered and Spread into the Malay Archipelago (Damascus, 2003)
 The Syrian Politics of Alliances 1918–1982 (Damascus, 2015)

Legal actions
He sued his daughter Yara's former husband the actor Mustafa El Khani in 2017 accusing him of defamation and libel after he accused his son Amir of attacking a police detachment in Damascus in a post on Facebook.

See also
Embassy of Syria in Russia

References

External links

1956 births
Permanent Representatives of Syria to the United Nations
Ambassadors of Syria to Indonesia
Damascus University alumni
Living people